is a 1995 air combat arcade game. Released by Namco, it is the sequel to Namco's 1993 arcade game Air Combat. Its name comes from it running on Namco's Super System 22 hardware. It was released as both a dedicated deluxe arcade cabinet, and as an arcade conversion kit for Air Combat.

Gameplay

Gameplay is similar to the original Air Combat game, with the addition of being able to control one of three aircraft, namely the Grumman F-14 Tomcat, Sukhoi Su-27 and the Lockheed Martin F-22 Raptor. It was available as either an arcade conversion kit for the original Namco System 21 Air Combat cabinet, or a dedicated deluxe arcade cabinet (measuring 78" high, 43" wide and 111" deep).

Reception
Next Generation reviewed the arcade version of the game, rating it three stars out of five, and stated that "as it is, Air Combat 22 is just a good facelift". Game Players called the arcade game "a screaming good time and worth every quarter", praising the game's "huge screen" and "authentic cockpit". Edge stated that the game "has few actual gameplay improvements" over Air Combat, but "boasts updated ground detail and enhanced aircraft", calling its surface detail "gorgeous". The publication also stated that the game was given "more of a close-combat feel", calling the result "a more exciting match-up".

Notes

References

External links
 
 Air Combat 22 at the Arcade History database

1995 video games
Ace Combat
Arcade video games
Arcade-only video games
Flight simulation video games
Namco arcade games
Namco System 22 games
Video games developed in Japan